Corinne Marchand (born 4 December 1931 in Paris) is a French actress. She is best known for playing the pop singer Cléo in Cléo from 5 to 7.

Selected filmography

Awards
 Prix Suzanne Bianchetti (1962)

References

External links
 

1937 births
Living people
Actresses from Paris
French actresses